John Dinkota (born 11 December 1994) is a professional footballer who plays as a defender for Championnat National 2 club Jura Sud. Born in Switzerland, he holds both Canadian and Swiss citizenship.

Career
Born in Geneva, Switzerland, Dinkota and his family moved to Quebec when he was seven years old. He started playing for local clubs before joining the academy of the Montreal Impact. He also played for PDL side Montreal Impact U23. He then joined USL affiliate side FC Montreal. Dinkota made his professional debut for FC Montreal on March 28, 2015 against Toronto FC II. He started and played 78 minutes as FC Montreal lost 2–0.

In May 2016, Dinkota signed with Mont-Royal Outremont in the PLSQ.

Personal life
Born in Switzerland, Dinkota is of Congolese descent. He moved to Canada at the age of 7.

Career statistics

References

1994 births
Living people
Footballers from Geneva
Association football defenders
Swiss men's footballers
Canadian soccer players
Swiss emigrants to Canada
Swiss people of Democratic Republic of the Congo descent
Canadian people of Democratic Republic of the Congo descent
Canadian sportspeople of African descent
Sportspeople of Democratic Republic of the Congo descent
Montreal Impact U23 players
FC Montreal players
CMS Oissel players
CS Mont-Royal Outremont players
Jura Sud Foot players
USL League Two players
USL Championship players
Expatriate soccer players in Canada
Canadian Soccer League (1998–present) players
Championnat National 2 players
Championnat National 3 players